When an engine is flat rated it means that an engine of high horsepower rating is constrained to a lower horsepower rating. The engine output in this case will always remain the same, but when atmospheric conditions such as high temperatures and high altitude ("hot and high") reduce the power output of the engine it has more headroom before it falls below the limited maximum output. In some cases the total power output of an engine needs to be constrained because the airframe can only handle a certain force. This is the case with gas turbine engines. Flat rating allows airplanes to operate under more demanding conditions, without the need for extra structural strengthening due to higher peak power output of the engine.

For example, the Garrett AiResearch TPE-331-5 engine originally fitted on the Dornier 228 produces . If the outside air temperature is above 20°C, the airplane's maximum speed is reduced by approximately 10 knots (19 km/h), because hotter air is less dense and thus produces less pressure inside the turbine. The Dornier 228 can also be fitted with the Garrett AiResearch TPE-331-10 conversion of the -5 engine which produces  but is limited (flat rated) to only 715. In this case the airplane will be able to maintain its top speed at temperatures above 30°C without the risk of exceeding the airplane's structural limits.

External links
Honeywell Aerospace
TPE 331 Engine Conversions
Dornier 228 Information Center

Aircraft engines